Back & Fourth is the fourth full-length release from singer/songwriter Pete Yorn.

Critical reception 

Allmusic gave the album three out of five stars.
Rolling Stone gave it 3.5 stars

Track listing 
All songs written by Pete Yorn.
 "Don't Wanna Cry" – 3:56
 "Paradise Cove" – 3:56
 "Close" – 4:23
 "Social Development Dance" – 4:53
 "Shotgun" – 4:00
 "Last Summer" – 4:53
 "Thinking of You" – 3:41
 "Country" – 5:04
 "Four Years" – 3:45
 "Long Time Nothing New" – 4:15

iTunes Store bonus track
 "Rooftop" – 4:10

iTunes Store pre-order bonus track
 "Welcome" – 3:42

Bonus CD 
Some releases of the album include Acoustic Session, an extended play recorded on May 7, 2009, at Swing House, Los Angeles.
 "Close"
 "Don't Wanna Cry"
 "Shotgun"

Personnel
Pete Yorn – acoustic guitar, electric guitar, percussion, lead vocals, background vocals
Ben Brodin – bowed vibes, Hammond B-3 organ, piano, pump organ, vibraphone, Wurlitzer
Joe Carnes – bass guitar, upright bass
Jason DeWater – french horn
Leslie Fagan – flute, alto flute
Orenda Fink – background vocals
Craig Fuller – tuba
Scott Gaeta – drums
Tom Hartig – tenor saxophone
Mike Mogis – bowed vibes, e-bow, baritone guitar, electric guitar, hammer dulcimer, mandolin, percussion, string arrangements, vibraphone, Wurlitzer
Anton Patzner – string arrangements, violin
Louis Patzner – string arrangements, cello
Darrin Pettit – tenor saxophone, baritone saxophone
Jonny Polonsky – bajo sexto, 12-string electric guitar, acoustic guitar, electric guitar, nylon string guitar
Scott Quackenbush – trumpet
R. Walt Vincent – keyboard bass, synthesizer bass, Wurlitzer
Nate Walcott – Hammond B-3 organ, horn arrangements, piano, string arrangements, tack piano
Joey Waronker – drums, percussion
Jay Wise – trombone

References 

2009 albums
Albums produced by Rick Rubin
Columbia Records albums
Pete Yorn albums
Albums produced by Mike Mogis